The 2002–03 Divizia A was the eighty-fifth season of Divizia A, the top-level football league of Romania. Season began in August 2002 and ended in May 2003. Rapid București became champions on 24 May 2003.

Team changes

Relegated
The teams that were relegated to Divizia B at the end of the previous season:
 Petrolul Ploiești
 UM Timișoara

Promoted
The teams that were promoted from Divizia B at the start of the season:
 Poli AEK Timișoara
 UTA Arad

Venues

Personnel and kits

League table

Positions by round

Results

Promotion / relegation play-off
The teams placed on the 13th and 14th place in the Divizia A faced the 2nd placed teams from both groups of the Divizia B. Politehnica AEK Timișoara and FC Oradea won the relegation play-offs.

Even though Oțelul Galați lost the relegation play-off against FC Oradea, they kept their place in the Divizia A because Petrolul Ploiești, the club that won the Divizia B, Seria I, sold its promotion place to Oțelul Galați and merged with Astra Ploiești, the other team from the city of Ploiești, which finished on the 9th position this season.

Attendances

Top goalscorers

Champion squad

References

Liga I seasons
Romania
1